Quirino, officially the Municipality of Quirino, is a 4th class municipality in the province of Ilocos Sur, Philippines. According to the 2020 census, it has a population of 9,306 people.

Formerly known as Angaki (also spelled Angkaki in some sources), the municipality was renamed in June 1964 to Quirino in honor of Elpidio Quirino, an Ilocos Sur native who served as the sixth President of the Philippines.

Geography

Barangays
Quirino is politically subdivided into 9 barangays. These barangays are headed by elected officials: Barangay Captain, Barangay Council, whose members are called Barangay Councilors. All are elected every three years.

 Banoen
 Cayus
 Lamag (formerly Tubtuba)
 Legleg (Poblacion)
 Malideg
 Namitpit
 Patiacan
 Patungcaleo (formerly Lamag)
 Suagayan

Climate

Demographics

In the 2020 census, Quirino had a population of 9,306.

Economy

Government
Quirino, belonging to the second congressional district of the province of Ilocos Sur, is governed by a mayor designated as its local chief executive and by a municipal council as its legislative body in accordance with the Local Government Code. The mayor, vice mayor, and the councilors are elected directly by the people through an election which is being held every three years.

Elected officials

See also
List of renamed cities and municipalities in the Philippines

References

External links
Pasyalang Ilocos Sur
Philippine Standard Geographic Code
Philippine Census Information
Local Governance Performance Management System

Municipalities of Ilocos Sur
Populated places on the Abra River